Heavy Liquid is a six-CD limited edition boxed set that chronicles the rehearsals and sessions for Raw Power, the third album by rock band The Stooges. Spanning 1972–1974 it also contains live recordings and interviews.

Description
Heavy Liquid was compiled from many tapes, including a recently discovered multi-track master tape that held every note and snippet of studio dialogue from July 1972, plus another recently discovered ¼" tape from March 1973. These two particular tapes were the main reason to get this boxed set since most of the other material had been released in semi-legal releases in various countries.

Three and a fourth partial of the six CDs in the box set hold every note, word, and sound from the sessions. The sessions discs span from Spring of 1972 to July 1973.
Disc one
The oddest thing about the first disc is that it contains 13 takes of "I Got a Right!" While some may get tired of this, many Stooges fanatics will enjoy it hearing each little minor tweak and difference. A few takes of "Gimme Some Skin", "I'm Sick of You!", "Scene of the Crime" and "Tight Pants" (later known as "Shake Appeal" which shows up on 1973's Raw Power) also were done in this session. Some of these takes and versions were put out on a few Bomp! Records releases through the Iguana Chronicles series. This session also features the only known studio recordings of Barrett Strong's song, "Money (That's What I Want)" and The Kingsmen's song, "Louie Louie".
Disc two
The second disc features the band rehearsing for the Ford Auditorium show which was going to take place on March 29, 1973. The sessions sees the band rehearsing Raw Power songs plus a new song called "Head On (Curve)".
Disc three
The third disc shows an assortment of songs from various rehearsals in Detroit, Michigan from February to April 1973. Many of these songs, including "Open Up and Bleed" and "Rubber Legs" were supposedly going to be songs to make up the band's fourth record. Recordings from February 20 and March 11 were not included due to too much tape damage.
Disc four
The first half of the fourth CD has the band rehearsing at CBS Studios in New York City around the time of July for the forthcoming two days at Max's Kansas City where Iggy Pop nearly killed himself. The second half of the fourth disc features the band at the previously mentioned venue which, along the last two CDs, give the listener a taste of how The Stooges sounded when performing live. While the live recordings are only of fair-to-poor sound quality, they were 'cleaned up' for this release.
Disc five
The fifth disc features live material from the Whisky a Go Go in Los Angeles, California around October 1973. The original tape dated it as October 17, 1973 but there is no mention of the band played the venue on that day.
Disc six
Finally, we reach the end of the box set with a cleaned up recording of a performance at Bimbo's 365 Club in San Francisco, California. This show from January 1974 had recently been going around as an inferior copy at the wrong speed but thankfully was speed-corrected. This version also includes, "Open Up and Bleed" which had previously been omitted from the inferior copy in circulation. This disk was going to end with infamous last show on February 9, 1974 but due to legal reasons the company was prevented from doing so. Included on this last disc is an interview with Iggy Pop talking to Dick Clark.
Liner notes
The liner notes were written and edited by Brian Bowe, an editor of an online, 21st century version of Creem magazine, and included an introduction by Stooges expert Carlton P. Sandercock as well as 1972 articles from Melody Maker and After Dark magazines, a remembrance from Stooges biographer Robert Matheu, and original Creem magazine cover pages from that era.  Bowe's article includes interviews all of the surviving Stooges (sans Williamson and Recca). The outer lid of the boxed set features a live photo of Iggy Pop in 1972 taken by well-known Rock photographer, Mick Rock covered in gloss while the inside of the box holds the CDs, the liner notes booklet, a photography booklet by Mick Rock and two gloss stickers that produce the cover. The inserts of the first two CDs reproduce the time-sheets from the two sessions. The later four feature live photos.

Reception
Heavy Liquid was cited as one of the Reissues of the Year for 2005 by The Wire magazine.

Track listing

References

External links
Amazon.com's reader reviews on Heavy Liquid

The Stooges albums
2005 compilation albums